Barbara Anne Cage (26 September 1941 – 16 September 1997), also known as Barbara McCarthy, was an Australian gymnast. She competed in six events at the 1964 Summer Olympics.

References

External links
 
 

1941 births
1997 deaths
Australian female artistic gymnasts
Olympic gymnasts of Australia
Gymnasts at the 1964 Summer Olympics
Sportswomen from Queensland